Cingulochitina is an extinct genus of chitinozoans. It was described by Paris in 1981.

Species
 Cingulochitina baltica Nestor, 1994
 Cingulochitina bouniensis Verniers, 1999
 Cingulochitina cingulata (Eisenack, 1937)
 Cingulochitina convexa (Laufeld, 1974)
 Cingulochitina crassa Nestor, 1994
 Cingulochitina gorstyensis Sutherland, 1974

References

Prehistoric marine animals
Fossil taxa described in 1981